The San Mateo intermediate station is part of the TransMilenio mass transit system of Bogota, Colombia.

Location 
The station is located in the central sector of Soacha, specifically on the Autopista Sur with Calle 30. It  servesthe neighborhoods of Ciudad Verde, El Nogal, El Porvenir, Ciudadela Sucre and its surroundings.

History 
The inauguration of the station was delayed by the construction of Phase 1 in Soacha. It will be integrated with a new shopping center. On May 28, 2016, the feeder terminal opened. That same day, the circular route San Mateo began to operate that connects this station directly with the Portal del Sur in Bogota.

Facilities 
The feeder terminal is on the north side of the Autopista Sur, connected to the station by a pedestrian bridge widening the access to the station. A bicycle rack offers 650 available spaces.

Etymology 
The station name alludes to the nearby San Mateo neighborhood. Near it are Mercurio, Antares and Unisur shopping centers.

Service Station

Main Services

Urban service 
Also works the following circular urban route between Bogota and Soacha:	
  Bogota - San Mateo.

References

External links 
 TransMilenio
 www.surumbo.com official interactive query system TransMilenio maps

TransMilenio